Forrester High School is a secondary school in the west of Edinburgh, Scotland.

St Augustine's High School, an RC secondary, moved onto a shared campus with Forrester High School in January 2010. Previously the schools had been next to each other.

Houses 
Forrester's pupils are split into three houses:
 Telford House
 Redpath House
 Burns House

Feeder schools 
Forrester High School's feeder schools are Broomhouse Primary, Carrick Knowe Primary, Gylemuir Primary and Murrayburn Primary School.

Notable alumni 

 Arthur Albiston, footballer
 Ryan Harding, footballer
 Davey Johnstone, rock musician.
 Allan McGregor, footballer
 Les McKeown, Bay City Rollers
 Graeme Souness, footballer
 John Swinney, SNP politician, and Scottish Government minister
 Jamie Walker, footballer 
 Lee Wallace, footballer

External links

References 

Secondary schools in Edinburgh
Corstorphine